George Orr may refer to:

 George E. Ohr (1857–1918), American ceramic artist
 George Orr (cricketer) (1896–1972), Australian-born New Zealand cricketer
 George Orr, protagonist of the novel The Lathe of Heaven